Air Force Technical College is in Bangalore, India.

History
Air Force Technical College (AFTC) was established on 4 July 1949, in collaboration with Air Service Training Co. (Hamble), U.K. with Gp.Capt. J Beaumont CBE, DFC, as the first Commandant.  The college was then named as Technical Training College (TTC). The entire staff of the college were officers and technicians from the Royal Air Force (RAF). The first principal of the college was Gp.Capt. Vaghuan Phillips, who was succeeded by Gp. Capt. Thripps. Technical staff included Sir. William Houghton - the co-inventor of Radar, Mr. B.H.Middleton of Smiths Aircraft Instruments U.K., Mr. Holbon of Rolls-Royce and Mr. Sturggeon of de Havilland. Mr.Porter headed the Department of Basic Engineering Technology.

Technicians were trained for the IAF from 1949, after India became independent. The youths were aged between 15 and 17.5. The streams were divided into seven categories: airframes, aero engines, aircraft instruments, electricals, wireless, radar, and armaments, and allotted according to the individual's aptitude. The ab initio training was for a period of two years as aircraft apprentice followed by one-year practical training at the various air force flying and maintenance establishments in the country after which they returned to the college for advanced training in their disciplines for another year. However this was modified after the sixth entry of apprentices passed out and the later batches were trained for the entire four years at the A.F.T.C., after the completion of which they passed out as full aircraft technicians in Group I trades with a liability to render 15 years regular and 9 years reserve service. Some of them later qualified and rose to the position of Air Marshal in their respective branches of specialization or branched off to other flying arms like pilots, navigators, flight signalers, flight engineers, flight gunners. Many left the IAF to become engineers, technocrats and managers in civilian establishments. Some of them joined the Indian Army during the Indo-China war and rose to the rank of colonel in technical branches. The first apprentice who graduated from the college in 1951 carrying the service No. 400001 by name G.K. Pillay belonged to the Aero Engines group. Most of the graduates from AFTC during the course of employment in the IAF were trained in foreign countries like UK, US, Germany, France and Russia on specialised equipment and aircraft.

In commemoration of completion of 60 years since the passing-out of the I batch of technicians, an alumni association called  "Afticans" was formed in 2011 led by G. Sivasankara Pillai (14th Rad.).Annual Reunions are held where the former Apprentices along with their family, who are now in the seventies and eighties congregate to savour their nostalgia! The 10th Reunion meeting was held at AFTC, presided over by the incumbent commandant Air.Cmde. C.R.Mohan V.S.M. when 22 octogenarian ex-apprentices were honoured, followed by a gala lunch at the aircraft hangar on 4 July 2017 coinciding with the college raising day. The speech of the commandant entailing a visionary approach for the future growth of the college was greatly appreciated by the veterans.

After TTC was renamed as AFTC on 1 January 1957, Gp. Capt M.J. Kriplani MBE took over as the first Indian commandant of the college. AFTC is the alma mater for all technical officers of the Indian Air Force. In December 1962, during the national emergency, the Apprentices' Training Scheme was terminated with the 22nd Entry and the Direct entry officers' training was accelerated.  In Dec 1971 the four technical branches of Tech (Engines), Tech (Elect), Tech (Signals) & Tech (Armament) were integrated into two i.e., Aeronautical Engineering (Mechanical) and Aeronautical Engineering (Electronics) designated as AE(M) and AE(L). The first batch to graduate under this scheme commenced their training in Jan 1972. The college is equipped with many Engineering and Science laboratories, fighter, bomber, and transport aircraft, and has an airfield.

The crest of the college depicts a mechanical gear and emanating electrical waves superimposed by torch bearing an eternal flame. The President of India approved the crest on 8 Aug 1962. The motto on the crest is 'Gyanen Shobhamahe' (it is knowledge through which we find pride in ourselves). The college was awarded the "Presidential Colors" by Pratibha Patil on 12 November 2008.

Milestones:

Some of the important events in the history of AFTC are given below:-
(a) September 1951 - 1st Entry Passing out-Parade of Apprentices From T.T.C.

(b) 1 April 1954 - First Indian Chief of Staff Air Marshal Mukherjee takes salute at the Passing out Parade held in the college air field of 2nd entry Con-Course and 6th entry Apprentices.
 
(c) April 1956. Air Services Training Ltd.,(Hamble) hand over the training responsibilities to Indian staff.
 
(d)1 January 1957 - name changed to Air Force Technical College

(e) March 1958 - first Foreign Officer (Indonesian) joins

(f) August 1962 - President of India approves crest of AFTC Gyanen Shobhamahe'

(g) December 1962 - aircraft apprentices scheme comes to a close

(h) April 1993 - first batch of 25 women officers are inducted

(j) July 1999 - golden jubilee year celebrated

(k) August 2003 - establishment of Software Development Centre

(l) 26 May 2005 - Chief of Air Staff inaugurates Back- drop to Parade Ground

(m) 1 April 2006 - commencement of first distance education course

(n) 12 November 2008 - Presidential Colors awarded

(O) 14 November 2014 - surviving apprentices from 1st to 22nd entry visit. The commandant hosts a tea party in their honour

(p) 11 November 2016 - Presentation of rolling trophies and mementos for being awarded to future engineers by ex-apprentices

(q) 4 July 2017 - graduates celebrate the college raising day with a ceremonial lunch after a convention in the auditorium

Program
The stated aim of the college is to produce officers of the highest class with thorough professional excellence.

Commandants

References

{[Category: Air Headquarters]}

Air force academies
Colleges in Bangalore
Indian Air Force
Military academies of India
Boarding schools in Karnataka